Eons.com was a social networking site marketed towards baby boomers and other internet users over age 40.

History 

Launched by Monster.com founder Jeff Taylor in July 2006, Eons was backed by venture capital financing from General Catalyst Partners, Sequoia Capital, Charles River Ventures, Intel Capital and Humana, Inc.

In April 2011, it was announced that Crew Media had acquired Eons, and baby boomer online advertising network Eons BOOM Media. Crew Media is owned by Continuum Crew, a San Francisco Bay area-based advertising and marketing agency that targets mature consumers. It was acquired for an undisclosed amount and the details of the agreement were not made public.

In June 2012, the site shut down and the following was posted on the EON Facebook webpage:

"To our Eons members,

We know many you have all been waiting patiently for news on the future of the site. As a team, we have been working to resolve the business issues with our service provider. We have negotiated in good faith to restore the site and move forward. Unfortunately our provider is demanding a financial commitment that we cannot make at this time. We are at an impasse. While we have worked behind the scenes to try to come up with an alternative to get the site restored, none of those have worked out either. For the foreseeable future, the site will remain down.

As Matt stated before, there is no reason to worry about your personal data; it is secure. We will continue to pursue all avenues available to bring Eons back."

To date the site remains offline.

References

External links
 Official website

American social networking websites
Internet properties established in 2006